NGC 1964 is a barred spiral galaxy in the constellation Lepus. The galaxy lies 65 million light years away from Earth, which means, given its apparent dimensions, that NGC 1964 is approximately 100,000 light years across. At its center lies a supermassive black hole, with estimated mass 2.5 × 107 . The galaxy features two tightly wound inner spiral arms within a disk with high surface brightness and two outer, more open spiral arms that originate near the inner ring. The outer arms feature few small HII regions.

NGC 1964 is the main galaxy in a group of galaxies, known as the NGC 1964 group, which also includes the galaxies NGC 1979, IC 2130 and IC 2137.

Supernova SN 2021jad (Type Ia, mag. 12.9) was discovered in this galaxy in April 2021.

Gallery

References

External links 
 

Intermediate spiral galaxies
Lepus (constellation)
1964
17436